This is a list of Russian federal subjects by Human Development Index as of 2019 (2021 data - Analytical Center for the Government of the Russian Federation).

Federal districts 
This is a list of Russian federal districts by Human Development Index as of 2021.

See also
List of countries by Human Development Index

References 

Russia, HDI
Human Development Index
HDI
Russia